Damias coeruleomarginata is a moth of the family Erebidae first described by Walter Rothschild in 1912. It is found in New Guinea.

Subspecies
Damias coeruleomarginata coeruleomarginata
Damias coeruleomarginata insularis (Rothschild, 1936) (Goodenough Island)

References

Damias
Moths described in 1912